SMS Planet was a survey ship of the Kaiserliche Marine. Her sister-ship was the SMS Möwe.
Planet was built by AG Weser in Bremen, launched on 2 August 1905 and commissioned on 16 November 1905. The crew of the ship consisted of six officers, four deck officers and 81 petty officers, sailors, stokers, and craftsmen.

At the outbreak of World War I the ship was serving in the German North Pacific islands. On 7 October 1914 the crew of Planet scuttled the vessel off the island of Yap to avoid capture by Japanese naval forces under the command of Rear Admiral Tatsuo Matsumura.

References

World War I auxiliary ships of Germany